Sven Jablonski (born 13 April 1990) is a German football referee who is based in Bremen. He referees for Blumenthaler SV of the Bremen Football Association.

Refereeing career
Jablonski, referee of the club Blumenthaler SV, has officiated on the DFB level since 2010. He was promoted to officiate in the 3. Liga for the 2011–12 season, with his first match as referee between VfR Aalen and Wehen Wiesbaden on 13 August 2011. After three years, Jablonski was nominated as referee for the 2014–15 season of the 2. Bundesliga, refereeing his first match between FSV Frankfurt and RB Leipzig. In 2017, Jablonski was one of four referees promoted to officiate in the Bundesliga for the 2017–18 season.

Personal life
Jablonski lives in Bremen, where he works as a bank teller.

References

External links
 Profile at dfb.de 
 Profile at worldfootball.net

1990 births
Living people
German football referees